The Guangzhou–Hong Kong high-speed train are high-speed train services operating between  in Guangzhou and  in Hong Kong.

History 
The G6581-6588 trains, operated by MTR Vibrant Express, started service on the same day.

Operations 
China Railway operates the G6501-6558 trains of which the G6503/6504 trains are operated by CR Shanghai and others are operated by CR Guangzhou. The G6581-6588 trains are operated by MTR.

The G6503/6535/6537 trains towards Hong Kong West Kowloon and G6520/6544/6548 trains towards Guangzhou South provide non-stop services and are the fastest trains on the service with a travelling time of 47 min.

The information below is effective from 23 September 2018.
 ● : stop at the station
 － : pass the station

Towards Hong Kong West Kowloon:

Towards Guangzhou South:

Other services 
There are some other trains also providing high-speed train connections between Guangzhou and Hong Kong.
 The G79/80 Beijing–Hong Kong high-speed train 
 The G99/100 Shanghai–Hong Kong high-speed train 
 The G6113/6114 Changsha–Hong Kong high-speed train 
 The G314/1 and G312/3 Kunming–Hong Kong high-speed train

Rolling stocks 
CR400AF-A EMUs are used on the trains operated by CR Guangzhou and CR400BF-A EMUs are used on the G6503/6504 trains operated by CR Shanghai. The EMUs have the formation shown below.  

The Vibrant Express of MTR are operated by 8-car trainsets with first and second class seats only. A total of 68 first class seats are available in the first and last cars in 2+2 formation. The middle cars offer 511 second class seats in 3+2 formation, with wheelchair spaces are provided on the seventh car.

References 

China Railway passenger services
Passenger rail transport in China
Railway services introduced in 2018